Lodoga (also Ladoga) is a census-designated place in Colusa County, California. It lies at an elevation of 1237 feet (377 m). Lodoga's population was 184 at the 2020 census.

History
The postal authorities established a post office at Lodoga in 1898, closed it in 1913, reopened it later in 1913, closed it again in 1917, reopened it again in 1924, and closed it permanently in 1954.

The locality stands at the southern end of the East Park Reservoir, formed by the East Park Dam after its construction in 1910.  The dam, the reservoir, and other surrounding irrigation facilities were some of the first projects undertaken by the United States Bureau of Reclamation.

Demographics

The 2010 United States Census reported that Lodoga had a population of 197. The racial makeup of Lodoga was 167 (84.8%) White, 16 (8.1%) African American, 4 (2.0%) Native American, 2 (1.0%) Asian, 2 (1.0%) Pacific Islander, 3 (1.5%) from other races, and 3 (1.5%) from two or more races. Hispanic or Latino of any race were 8 persons (4.1%).

The Census reported that 197 people (100% of the population) lived in households, 0 (0%) lived in non-institutionalized group quarters, and 0 (0%) were institutionalized.

There were 98 households, out of which 18 (18.4%) had children under the age of 18 living in them, 45 (45.9%) were opposite-sex married couples living together, 5 (5.1%) had a female householder with no husband present, 6 (6.1%) had a male householder with no wife present.  There were 5 (5.1%) unmarried opposite-sex partnerships, and 1 (1.0%) same-sex married couples or partnerships. 39 households (39.8%) were made up of individuals, and 19 (19.4%) had someone living alone who was 65 years of age or older. The average household size was 2.01.  There were 56 families (57.1% of all households); the average family size was 2.59.

The population was spread out, with 26 people (13.2%) under the age of 18, 3 people (1.5%) aged 18 to 24, 26 people (13.2%) aged 25 to 44, 86 people (43.7%) aged 45 to 64, and 56 people (28.4%) who were 65 years of age or older.  The median age was 54.5 years. For every 100 females, there were 116.5 males.  For every 100 females age 18 and over, there were 106.0 males.

The homeowner vacancy rate was 1.3%; the rental vacancy rate was 0%.  159 people (80.7% of the population) lived in owner-occupied housing units and 38 people (19.3%) lived in rental housing units.

References

Census-designated places in Colusa County, California
Census-designated places in California